Jacqueline Grace "Jacqui" Dunn (born 3 May 1984) is an Australian artistic gymnast.

Dunn competed at the 2002 Commonwealth Games where she won a gold medal in the women's all around team event and a bronze medal in the balance beam event.

Eponymous skill 
Dunn has one eponymous skill listed in the Code of Points.

References

External links
 

1984 births
Living people
Australian female artistic gymnasts
Gymnasts at the 2002 Commonwealth Games
Commonwealth Games medallists in gymnastics
Commonwealth Games gold medallists for Australia
Commonwealth Games bronze medallists for Australia
Originators of elements in artistic gymnastics
21st-century Australian women
Medallists at the 2002 Commonwealth Games